Kumar Kushagra (born 23 October 2004) is an Indian cricketer. He made his List A debut on 20 February 2021, for Jharkhand in the 2020–21 Vijay Hazare Trophy. Prior to his debut, he was named in India's squad for the 2020 Under-19 Cricket World Cup. He made his Twenty20 debut on 4 November 2021, for Jharkhand in the 2021–22 Syed Mushtaq Ali Trophy.

He made his first-class debut on 24 February 2022, for Jharkhand in the 2021–22 Ranji Trophy. In March 2022, in the preliminary quarter-final match of Ranji Trophy, Kushagra scored his maiden century in first-class cricket, before going on to convert it into his maiden double century in first-class cricket.

References

External links
 

2004 births
Living people
Indian cricketers
Jharkhand cricketers